Roy Anselm Hollingsworth (born 28 December 1933) is a former international athlete.

Athletics career
Born in Trinidad, he represented England in the 1962 British Empire and Commonwealth Games before representing Great Britain at the 1964 Summer Olympics in the discus and came tenth in that competition. Representing Trinidad, he came fifth in the 1966 Commonwealth Games. He was the British National discus champion on one occasion. He was affiliated to Highgate Harriers and his personal best was 56.71m in 1963. In 1969, Hollingsworth married Afro-Puerto Rican Georgina Falú Pesante and they had one son, Rey Hollingsworth Falú. Roy A. Hollingsworth died on September 17, 2014.

References

1933 births
Living people
British male discus throwers
Olympic athletes of Great Britain
Athletes (track and field) at the 1964 Summer Olympics
Commonwealth Games competitors for England
Athletes (track and field) at the 1962 British Empire and Commonwealth Games
Commonwealth Games competitors for Trinidad and Tobago
Athletes (track and field) at the 1966 British Empire and Commonwealth Games
Trinidad and Tobago male discus throwers
Central American and Caribbean Games gold medalists for Trinidad and Tobago
Competitors at the 1966 Central American and Caribbean Games
Central American and Caribbean Games medalists in athletics